Stanley Hanson (27 December 1915 – 24 November 1987) was an English footballer who played for Bolton Wanderers for his whole professional career.

Career 
Starting off as an amateur with Liverpool and Southport he turned down Aston Villa to sign professional forms for Bolton in October 1935.

He did not make the goalkeepers shirt his own until the 1938–39 season and then his career was interrupted by the Second World War.

He returned to top-flight football and stayed playing with Bolton until he was nearly 40. He was Bolton's keeper in the Matthews' Cup Final. When he retired from football he stayed with the club as coach of the reserve side as well as running the post office near Burnden Park.

Personal life 
Hanson was of Norwegian descent and had a brother, Alf, who also played for Liverpool as well as Chelsea. He served in the 53rd (Bolton) Field Regiment, Royal Artillery, during the Second World War.

References

Further reading
Ponting, Ivan & Hugman, Barry. "The Concise Post War History of Bolton Wanderers". Repvern Publishing, 1994. 

1915 births
1987 deaths
Sportspeople from Bootle
Bolton Wanderers F.C. players
Liverpool F.C. players
Southport F.C. players
English footballers
English Football League players
Association football goalkeepers
English people of Norwegian descent
British Army personnel of World War II
Royal Artillery personnel
FA Cup Final players
Military personnel from Liverpool